Gyrandra is a genus of flowering plants in the family Gentianaceae, found in Texas, Mexico and Central America.  Annual herbs, they are usually found in montane pine-oak forests.

Species
Currently accepted species include:

Gyrandra blumbergiana (B.L.Turner) J.S.Pringle
Gyrandra brachycalyx (Standl. & L.O.Williams) G.Mans.
Gyrandra chironioides Griseb.
Gyrandra pauciflora (M.Martens & Galeotti) G.Mans.
Gyrandra pterocaulis (C.R.Broome) G.Mans.
Gyrandra tenuifolia (M.Martens & Galeotti) G.Mans.

References

Gentianaceae
Gentianaceae genera